Bart Yates is an American novelist, from Iowa City, Iowa.  He also writes under the pen name of Noah Bly.

Novels
The Brothers Bishop
The Distance Between Us
Leave Myself Behind
White Creek: A Fable

And writing as Noah Bly:
The Third Hill North Of Town

References

External links

 Official website

21st-century American novelists
American male novelists
Novelists from Iowa
American gay writers
Living people
American LGBT novelists
21st-century American male writers
Year of birth missing (living people)
21st-century American LGBT people